The Battle of Kupa occurred at Kupa river in 819. It involved Frankish vassal Duke Borna of Dalmatia, with an army of Guduscani, against the advancing army of Frankish rebel, Duke Ljudevit of the Slavs in Lower Pannonia. During the battle, the Guduscans abandoned Borna and joined Ljudevit. While Borna's forces suffered massive losses, he managed to escape with his bodyguards. However, Dragomuž, Ljudevit's father-in-law, who sided with Borna, was killed. Ljudevit suffered heavy casualties that included 3,000 soldiers and over 300 horses. Afterwards, Ljudevit used the momentum to invade Dalmatia in December 819.

Sources

Kupa
9th-century military history of Croatia
Kupa
819
9th century in Croatia